José Balseca (born 19 August 1933) is an Ecuadorian footballer. He played in two matches for the Ecuador national football team in 1963. He was also part of Ecuador's squad for the 1963 South American Championship.

References

1933 births
Living people
Ecuadorian footballers
Ecuador international footballers
Association football forwards
C.S. Emelec footballers
Sportspeople from Guayaquil